The International Radiation Protection Association (IRPA) is an independent non-profit association of national and regional radiation protection societies, and its mission is to advance radiation protection throughout the world. It is the international professional association for radiation protection.

IRPA is recognized by the IAEA as a Non Governmental Organization (NGO) and is an observer on the IAEA Radiation Safety Standards Committee (RASSC).

IRPA was formed on June 19, 1965, at a meeting in Los Angeles; stimulated by the desire of radiation protection professionals to have a world-wide body. Membership includes 50 Associate Societies covering 65 countries, totaling approximately 18,000 individual members.

Structure 
The General Assembly, made up of representatives from the Associate Societies, is the representative body of the Association. It delegates authority to the Executive Council for the efficient administration of the affairs of the Association.

Specific duties are carried out by IRPA Commissions, Committees, Task Groups and Working Groups:
 Commission on Publications
 Societies Admission and Development Committee
 International Congress Organising Committee
 International Congress Programme Committee
 Montreal Fund Committee
 Radiation Protection Strategy and Practice Committee
 Regional Congresses Co-ordinating Committee
 Rules Committee
 Sievert Award Committee
 Task Group on Security of Radioactive Sources
 Task Group on Public Understanding of Radiation Risk
 Working Group on Radiation Protection Certification and Qualification

Associate societies 
The following is a list of the 50 Associate Societies (covering 65 countries):

List of International Congresses 

The 2020 Congress (IRPA15) will be in Korea.

Past Congresses

IRPA 14 Cape Town, May 2016

IRPA 13 Glasgow, May 2012

IRPA 12 Buenos Aires, October 2008

IRPA 11 Madrid, May 2004

IRPA 10 Hiroshima, May 2000

IRPA 9 Vienna, April 1996

IRPA 8 Montreal, May 1992

IRPA 7 Sydney, April 1988

IRPA 6 Berlin, May 1984

IRPA 5 Jerusalem, March 1980

IRPA 4 Paris, April 1977

IRPA 3 Washington, September 1973

IRPA 2 Brighton, May 1970

IRPA 1 Rome, September 1966

International Cooperation 
IRPA maintains relations with many other international organizations in the field of radiation protection, such as those listed here.

Inter-Governmental Organizations

Non-Governmental Organizations

Professional Organizations

Awards

Rolf M. Sievert Award 
Commencing with the 1973 IRPA Congress, each International Congress has been opened by the Sievert Lecture which is presented by the winner of the Sievert Award. This award is in honour of Rolf M. Sievert, a pioneer in radiation physics and radiation protection.

The Sievert Award consists of a suitable scroll, certificate or parchment, containing the name of the recipient, the date it is presented, and an indication that the award honours the memory of Professor Rolf M. Sievert.

The recipients of the Sievert Award are listed below:

 1973 Prof.  (Sweden),  Radiation and Man Health Physics 31 (September), pp 265–272, 1976
 1977 Prof. W.V. Mayneord (United Kingdom),	 The Time Factor in Carcinogenesis Health Physics 34 (April), pp 297–309, 1978
 1980 Lauriston S. Taylor (USA), Some Nonscientific Influences on Radiation Protection Standards and Practice Health Physics 39 (December), pp 851–874, 1980
 1984 Sir Edward Pochin (United Kingdom),	 Sieverts and Safety Health Physics 46(6), pp 1173–1179, 1984
 1988 Prof. Dr.  (Germany),	 Environmental Radioactivity and Man Health Physics 55(6), pp 845–853, 1988
 1992 Dr. Giovanni Silini (Italy),	 Ethical Issues in Radiation Protection Health Physics 63(2), pp 139–148, 1992
 1996 Dr. Daniel Beninson (Argentina),	 Risk of Radiation at Low Doses Health Physics 71(2), pp 122–125, 1996
 2000 Prof. Dr. Itsuzo Shigematsu (Japan),	 Lessons from Atomic Bomb Survivors in Hiroshima and Nagasaki Health Physics 78(3), pp 234–241, 2000
 2004 Dr. Abel J. Gonzalez (Argentina), Protecting Life against the Detrimental Effects Attributable to Radiation Exposure: Towards a Globally Harmonized Radiation Protection Regime Paper prepared for IRPA
 2008 Prof.  (Germany),	 Radiological Protection: Challenges and Fascination of Biological Research Stralenschutz Praxis 2009/2, pp 35–45, 2009
 2012 Dr. Richard Osborne (Canada),	 A Story of T Lightly edited transcript of Dr. Osborne's lecture
 2016 Dr. John Boice (USA),	 How to Protect the Public When you Can't Measure the Risk - The Role of Radiation Epidemiology
 2020 Prof. Dr. Eliseo Vañó (Spain)

See also 
 Radioactivity
 Ionizing radiation
 Radiation protection
 International Atomic Energy Agency (IAEA)
 International Commission on Radiological Protection (ICRP)
 United Nations Scientific Committee on the Effects of Atomic Radiation (UNSCEAR)
 International Commission on Non-Ionizing Radiation Protection (ICNIRP)
 Index of radiation articles

References

External links 
 IRPA website

Radiation
Nuclear energy
Nuclear organizations
1965 establishments in California
Radiation protection